Eurofarma Laboratórios S.A. is a Brazilian multinational corporation engaged in biopharmaceuticals and is one of the largest medicaments producer in Brazil and Latin America. Founded in 1972, Eurofarma offer products like generics, oncology and veterinary medicine. In Brazil is responsible for 433 products, which represent 66% of the total market. The Eurofarma Group employs nearly to 7.600 people. 

Eurofarma has active operations in 20 countries, and factories in Brazil, Argentina, Bolivia, Chile, Colombia, Ecuador, Guatemala, Mexico, Mozambique, Paraguay, Peru, Uruguay and Venezuela.

COVID-19 vaccine
On 26 August 2021, Pfizer Inc. and BioNTech, the developers of the COMIRNATY vaccine against COVID-19, announced a partnership with Eurofarma to manufacture their vaccine in Brazil from 2022. Eurofarma will produce at least 100 million doses annually for distribution in the Latin American & Caribbean region. 

The agreement is also part of a effort launched by the World Health Organization and the Pan American Health Organization in partnership with the Brazilian government to increase the number of vaccine doses in other countries of the region through the WHO's COVAX Facility mechanism.

References

Conglomerate companies of Brazil
1972 establishments in Brazil
Pharmaceutical companies established in 1972
Companies based in São Paulo (state)
Conglomerate companies established in 1972
Multinational companies headquartered in Brazil
Brazilian brands